"Chanel (Go Get It)" is a song by American rapper Young Thug featuring American rappers Gunna and Lil Baby. It is a track from record label YSL Records' debut collaborative compilation album Slime Language (2018). The song was produced by Wheezy, SinGrinch and Psymun.

Composition
The song features a "hollowness that contorts around shaky hi-hats a warped horn sound, and a sprinkling of keys". It finds the rappers singing about being eager to buy their respective women luxurious clothes, cars and other products when they want them.

Critical reception
In an XXL review of Slime Language, Charles Holmes wrote that the song was "fascinating" because it "shows the endless permutations and offshoots of Thug's style", also adding, "Both feature artists have adopted their musical father's mushed-mouth melodic delivery, but where Gunna's flow rambles and elongates the last word of each bar, Baby assaults the beat with a clipped, rushed and bludgeoning flow." Patrick Lyons of HotNewHipHop wrote that "Lil Baby sounds effortless as ever" and "Gunna is stellar throughout" in the song.

Music video
The music video was released on November 26, 2018. Directed by Elliot Sellers and Sam Shea, it begins with a python unraveling to reveal itself covering a sleeping Young Thug's head. The three artists appear in an Atlanta parking lot at nighttime, where surrounding buildings warp, and a car melts. They then roam a forest where trees, branches and rocks are twisting out of shape or melting. The snake from earlier follows the rappers in the forest, growing in size as the video progresses, and eats Lil Baby.

Charts

Certifications

References

2018 songs
Young Thug songs
Gunna (rapper) songs
Lil Baby songs
Song recordings produced by Wheezy (record producer)
Songs written by Young Thug
Songs written by Gunna (rapper)
Songs written by Lil Baby
Songs written by Wheezy (record producer)